Leonor Angelica Espinoza Carranza (born 19 March 1998) is a Peruvian parataekwondo practitioner. She competed at the 2020 Summer Paralympics in the 49 kg category, winning the gold medal in the event.

References

External links
 

1998 births
Living people
Sportspeople from Lima
Peruvian female taekwondo practitioners
Paralympic taekwondo practitioners of Peru
Taekwondo practitioners at the 2020 Summer Paralympics
Paralympic gold medalists for Peru
Paralympic medalists in taekwondo
Medalists at the 2020 Summer Paralympics
Medalists at the 2019 Parapan American Games
20th-century Peruvian women
21st-century Peruvian women